Kickboxer is a 1989 American martial arts film directed by David Worth and starring Jean-Claude van Damme. Former world kickboxing champion Dennis Alexio is also featured. It spawned several sequels.

Plot
Kurt Sloane is the younger brother and cornerman of Eric Sloane, the heavyweight kickboxing world champion. After another successful title defense, Eric is enticed by the media to compete in Thailand, where kickboxing was started, to further establish his legacy. As a result, Eric and Kurt travel to Bangkok to fight Tong "The Tiger" Po, Thailand's undefeated top fighter. Eric is supremely confident, but Kurt becomes apprehensive after witnessing Tong Po kicking a concrete pillar in preparation for the fight. He begs Eric not to fight, but Eric dismisses any concerns.

Eric gets beaten badly until Kurt throws in the towel, but Tong Po kicks the towel out of the ring, and continues his assault. He viciously strikes Eric in the back, immobilizing him. Kurt leaves with his brother on a stretcher, but the fight officials leave them on the street. Winston Taylor, a retired United States Army Special Forces soldier, agrees to help the pair by driving them to the hospital. As a result of Tong Po's brutal attack, Eric is paralyzed from the waist down and will never be able to walk again.

An enraged Kurt vows to avenge his brother. He searches for a trainer to teach him Muay Thai, but is mocked and laughed out of the gym by the local fighters. Eventually, Taylor tells him about Xian Chow, a famous Muay Thai Kru. Although reluctant at first, Xian agrees to train Kurt after Kurt prevents goons sent by Freddy Li - a higher up in a racketeering organization and Tong Po's manager - from stealing money from Xian’s niece, Mylee. Xian convinces Freddy Li to arrange a preliminary match between Kurt and another fighter. Kurt is victorious and earns a match against Tong Po. It is determined that they will fight in the "ancient way": both fighters wrap their hands in hemp rope, which is then coated in resin, and dipped in broken glass to make them deadly weapons.

Freddy Li arranges to have the fight fixed, and borrows $1 million from the Thai crime syndicate's boss Tao Liu in order to bet on Tong Po. Prior to the match, Mylee is beaten and raped by Tong Po, while Eric is kidnapped so that Freddy Li can blackmail Kurt into losing the fight. Mylee begs Taylor to help find Eric, but he is reluctant to cross Freddy Li.

To save his brother's life, Kurt is instructed by Freddy Li to go the distance with Tong Po before losing the match. While Tong Po punishes Kurt, Xian and Taylor manage to locate Eric and rescue him. Before the final round, Eric arrives with Xian and Taylor. With Eric now out of danger Kurt defeats Tong Po.

Cast

 Jean-Claude Van Damme as Kurt Sloane
 Dennis Alexio as Eric Sloane
 Dennis Chan as Xian Chow, Muay Thai Kru
 Michel Qissi as Tong "The Tiger" Po
 Ka Ting Lee as Freddy Li
 Rochelle Ashana as Mylee
 Haskell Anderson as Winston Taylor
 Richard Foo as Tao Liu
 Wong Wing Shun as Lo
 Ricky Liu as Big Thai Man
 Priwan Sriharajmontri as Kurt's opponent
 Ong Soo Han as Tong Po's opponent
 Zennie Reynolds as U.S. fighter
 Andy Lee as doctor
 Joann Wong as Tao Liu's wife
 Kanthima Vutti as Eric's girl
 Montri Vongbutr as ancient warrior #1
 Amnart Komolthorn as ancient warrior #2

An uncredited Jim Cummings dubs Freddy Li's voice.

Music

Soundtrack
A soundtrack containing songs from the film was released featuring songs from soundtrack specialist Stan Bush. The score for the film was composed by Paul Hertzog. The full score was remastered and released in 2006 by Perseverance Records in limited quantity.

The 2006 official score release does not include a previously released version of the score track titled "Buddha's Eagle" which was released on the Best of Van Damme Volume 2 Compilation CD.

An expanded version of the 2006 album was released by Perseverance Records in July 2014. This album contained the remastered original 22 tracks plus 9 vocal performances that previously had only been available in Germany.

Release

Home media
Kickboxer was first released on VHS by HBO Video in 1990. DVD was released by HBO Home Video in the United States on June 8, 1999. The DVD was released by Prism Leisure Corporation in the United Kingdom on January 6, 2003.

Alternate versions

The most complete version of this film ever released was the R18+ Australian/New Zealand VHS video release by Palace Entertainment and The Movie Group. This version contained all of the original voice dubs and was fully uncut in terms of violence but had a few scenes trimmed due to print damage and the last fight was incorrectly edited at one point. This was first packaged as a rental in a double pack with another Van Damme film, Wrong Bet (Lionheart). While 1 minute 18 seconds of violence was trimmed by the BBFC in the UK VHS versions by 4Front/EIV video, the print damaged scenes and the final fight editing mistake had been rectified in this version. The UK versions had better picture quality and were brightened in colour compared to the darker Australian/New Zealand Palace R18+/M15+ releases.

Any other versions of the film that came out after the initial VHS releases were a heavily edited and re-dubbed version. Every version of the film released after 1995 on VHS, DVD and Blu-ray contain this inferior edited version. Certain scenes were cut altogether, some scenes re-edited as well as character lines and voices changed. Eric (Dennis Alexio)'s voice was re-dubbed, along with certain scenes of Van Damme and Michel Qissi (Tong Po).

Reception

Box office
Kickboxer grossed $14,697,005 in the United States. Cannon deliberately released it on the traditionally slow weekend after Labor Day when no studio releases, and thus limited competition; it opened on 973 screens and grossed $4.1 million, making it the third most popular film in the country. A few years later its gross was estimated at $50 million.

Critical response
Chris Willman of the Los Angeles Times called the film "egregiously dull" and a contender for one of "the dumbest action pictures of the year", citing its "jarring shifts in tone, insurmountable plot implausibilities, rampant racial stereotyping, superfluous nudity and inhuman amounts of comically exaggerated violence". Willman also questioned the manner in which characters seem to recover from serious injuries and major trauma.

Chris Hicks of the Deseret News criticized the film as a ripoff of The Karate Kid, with added elements from other films such as Rocky and Rambo. In addition to stating that the ending was predictable, Hicks also dismissed Van Damme as "little more than a low-budget Arnold Schwarzenegger wannabee" whose attempts at acting were in vain.

On Rotten Tomatoes the film has an approval rating of 36% based on reviews from 11 critics. On Metacritic the film has a score of 33% based on reviews from 4 critics.

Other media

Sequels

The film spawned several sequels. Despite Van Damme not returning, the film series between parts two and four continues the ongoing battles between the Sloane family (although now spelled Sloan) - expanded to include third brother David Sloan(e), played by Sasha Mitchell - and Tong Po.
Michel Qissi returned as Tong Po for Kickboxer 2: The Road Back and appears in a flashback scene shown at the beginning of Kickboxer 4: The Agressor. This scene looks to be a seemingly deleted scene from Kickboxer 2 that never made the final cut.
Tong Po was played by Kamel Krifa in Kickboxer 4.
Kickboxer 5: The Redemption was a stand-alone story with new characters and has a small connection to the previous films.

Reboot

Kickboxer was remade as Kickboxer: Vengeance, as a reboot of the series which was released on September 2, 2016.

References

External links
 
 
 Kickboxer on Jeanclaudevandamme.fr 

1989 films
1989 martial arts films
American martial arts films
American films about revenge
Films about brothers
Films set in Thailand
Films with screenplays by Jean-Claude Van Damme
Films shot in Thailand
Kickboxer (film series)
Muay Thai films
American Muay Thai films
American rape and revenge films
Golan-Globus films
Films directed by David Worth (cinematographer)
1980s English-language films
1980s American films
Films about disability